Chazara eitschbergeri is a butterfly species belonging to the family Nymphalidae. It can be found from Tienshan, Issyk-Kul region, Terskey-Alatoo, Kadzhi-Sai.

The butterflies fly from June to July.

External links
Satyrinae of the Western Palearctic - Chazara eitschbergeri

Chazara
Butterflies described in 1999